Club de Futbol Peralada is a Spanish football team based in Peralada, in Province of Girona of the autonomous community of Catalonia. Founded in 1915, it plays in Tercera División RFEF – Group 5, holding home matches at Municipal de Peralada with a capacity of 1,500 seats.

The club has acted as a reserve team of Girona FC from 2016 to 2019, with the name of Peralada-Girona B.

History
Peralada was founded in 1915 as a local community team, assembled simply to play friendly matches against other village teams in the area. The club eventually took the name Club Deportiu Peralada (Sports Club Peralada) in 1936, under the leadership of their first President, Martí Roca. At the time, their shirt was blue and they played games in a field owned by one Miquel Pujol, a site which has now been partially converted into a cafe.

During the upheaval of the Spanish Civil War the club took the decision to cease operations, only resuming sporting activities in 1950. The following year, the team moved to the Camp de Cal Músic, on land rented from the municipal government.

In 1981, the city council purchased the land which was to become their present stadium. Lack of funds prevented the site from being fully completed until 1992, however, when the Suqué-Mateu family - owners of Peralada Castle - turned the club's financial situation around with a generous sponsorship. The increased budget available and improved facilities were rewarded over the following several seasons, as CF Peralada steadily climbed to a level in the Catalan regional league system higher than it had ever previously reached in its history. By 2002/03, the club for the first time ascended from the Catalan regional divisions to enter the Tercera División, the lowest of the fully nation-wide leagues in Spain. Two seasons after this promotion, the club reached the semi-finals of the Copa Catalunya for the first time, where they were knocked out by no less than FC Barcelona.

Peralada's drive up the league pyramid ended as they levelled off their ascent by spending five seasons in the Tercera División before they were relegated back to the first tier of Catalan regional football in 2007. It would take a further seven seasons before the club was able to return to the Tercera, which they did in 2014.

Association with Girona FC
Paralleling Peralada's rise through the leagues a decade earlier, nearby side Girona FC had themselves risen from the Tercera División (the fourth tier of Spanish football) from the middle of the first decade of the new century to reach the Segunda División (the second tier), unsuccessfully contesting the play-offs for promotion to the summit of the league system, La Liga, three times in four seasons by 2016. Having set their sights on football at the highest level, it had become clear to Girona's management that the gap in footballing standards between their first team and their reserve team - a former village side only purchased in 2012 and sat three tiers below Girona FC itself - was too large for practical development of young players by transfer between the two teams. As a result, they began a search for a nearby team playing at a level in between the two, to act as an intermediary reserve side. Quickly identifying Peralada as a candidate for an affiliation relationship, the two clubs came to an understanding whereby they would affiliate for a fixed term of five years starting from 2016.

In 2017, Peralada played for the first time the play-offs to Segunda División B, but was eliminated in the last round by Rápido de Bouzas. However, on 7 July 2017, the club confirmed that it would promote to Segunda División B by paying the €133,000 the Royal Spanish Football Federation established for paying the debts of CF Gavà and CD Boiro players.

On 23 July 2017, the club's members voted in favour of renaming the club to CF Peralada-Girona B in recognition of the extension of the club's affiliation with Girona FC after their promotion to Segunda División B. The vinculation of Peralada with Girona finished in 2019, after the relegation of both clubs, of Peralada to Tercera and Girona to Segunda. In that 2018-19 season CF Peralada won just 8 of 28 games and finished 19th in the Segunda División B, Group 3.

Season to season

2 seasons in Segunda División B
10 seasons in Tercera División

Notes

Current squad

Former players
   Alberto Edjogo
   Rubén Epitié

References

External links
Official website
Official blog
Schedule & Standings
Estadios de España 

Football clubs in Catalonia
Association football clubs established in 1915
1915 establishments in Spain
Girona FC